Literal may refer to:

 Interpretation of legal concepts: 
 Strict constructionism 
 The plain meaning rule (a.k.a. "literal rule")
 Literal (mathematical logic), certain logical roles taken by propositions 
 Literal (computer programming), a fixed value in a program's source code
 Titled works:
 Literal (magazine)
 Three-issue series The Literals, in Fables comics franchise

See also 
 Literal and figurative language
 Literal translation
 Literalism (disambiguation)
 Littoral (disambiguation)
 Literally, English adverb